Villeblevin is a commune in the Yonne department in Bourgogne-Franche-Comté in north-central France.

The town achieved prominence in 1960 when it was the site of the car crash that killed Albert Camus.

See also
Communes of the Yonne department

References

Communes of Yonne